Tiago Cardoso Mendes  (born 2 May 1981), known simply as Tiago, is a Portuguese football manager and former player who played as a midfielder.

He played professionally in five of Europe's major leagues, Portugal, England, France, Italy and Spain. He notably spent eight seasons with Atlético Madrid, winning five major titles including the 2013–14 La Liga and the 2012 Europa League.

A Portugal international on 66 occasions, Tiago represented the nation in two World Cups and Euro 2004.

Club career

Portugal
Born in Viana do Castelo, Tiago first came to prominence at S.C. Braga (having started out at SC Vianense, he also played handball for one year as a youth), being cast into the Minho side's starting XI at the age of just 18 and helping with 27 games as they finished in fourth place in 2001, thus qualifying for the UEFA Cup.

In late December 2001, solid displays earned Tiago – and Braga teammates Armando Sá and Ricardo Rocha – a move to giants S.L. Benfica. In his first full season he scored a career-best 13 goals to help to a runner-up position in the Primeira Liga and, the following year, won the Taça de Portugal against FC Porto.

Chelsea
Tiago signed for Chelsea on 20 July 2004 for a €15 million fee, becoming José Mourinho's sixth signing that season (this included three other Portuguese players). Having missed the first Premier League game, he soon became an important member of his new team, scoring on his away debut against Crystal Palace on 24 August; he also scored a long-range goal in a 3–1 win over Manchester United on 10 May 2005, after already having won the title.

Tiago was a regular for Chelsea, having only missed four games in the league. He ended the season successfully as a firm fixture in the Blues' midfield three, making 51 appearances in all competitions and scoring four goals as the club also added the Football League Cup. However, despite his initial success, the following campaign saw the arrival of Michael Essien from Olympique Lyonnais, which limited his first-team chances; during his time at Stamford Bridge his loss percentage in the league was 2.94%, just once in 34 appearances – 1–0 at Manchester City on 16 October 2004 – which was the lowest in history for any player having appeared at least 20 times.

Lyon

In late August 2005, Tiago signed for Lyon on a four-year contract, for a €10.1 million transfer fee. Usually playing in a defensive midfield role alongside Juninho Pernambucano, Mahamadou Diarra and Florent Malouda, he excelled for his team, scoring seven goals in 37 appearances. The highlights of his first season in France were a pair of goals against PSV Eindhoven that took them into the quarter-finals in the UEFA Champions League, and the winning goal against Troyes AC on 1 April 2006; the club finished top of Ligue 1, winning a fifth consecutive accolade.

After the departure of Diarra to Real Madrid the following campaign, Tiago began to play a more significant role in Lyon's midfield with his former teammate's replacement Jérémy Toulalan. He won his second league title and helped reach the final of the Coupe de la Ligue, lost to FC Girondins de Bordeaux after a last-minute strike; overall, he netted six times in 38 matches.

Juventus
On 17 June 2007, Lyon president Jean-Michel Aulas confirmed that Tiago's departure from Lyon was imminent with both Juventus F.C. and A.C. Milan reportedly after his signature; he officially signed for the former five days later, for a €13 million fee. His performance in 2007–08 was criticised, however, with Goal.com describing him as the third biggest flop of the season.

The start of the following campaign gave Tiago an opportunity to return to the Premier League in the form of year-long loan offer from Everton, with the Italians agreeing to the deal but with the player refusing to terms. The negotiations had a violent end when he forcibly locked Juventus president Giovanni Cobolli Gigli inside a toilet stall – the chairman was finally rescued by captain Alessandro Del Piero, more than an hour later. He eventually established himself in Claudio Ranieri's side but, in November 2008, against Inter Milan, he was stretchered off the pitch with a serious knee injury just several minutes into the match, and was sidelined for almost two months.

Tiago returned to the bench for the January match against S.S. Lazio, but found himself down the pecking order as Cristiano Zanetti, Mohamed Sissoko, and emerging youngster Claudio Marchisio were Ranieri's preferred centre midfield pairing. Following injuries to Sissoko and later Marchisio he was back in the starting XI, but his return was soured by a straight red card in the Derby d'Italia fixture in April (1–1 home draw).

The first half of 2009–10 was one to forget for Tiago. With the arrivals of midfielders Diego and Felipe Melo, coupled by his slight dip in form, his appearances were again limited; under Ciro Ferrara he was relegated to the bench once again, only making seven Serie A appearances.

Atlético Madrid
On 8 January 2010, Tiago joined Atlético Madrid on loan until the end of the season. He scored his first league goal in nearly three years on 21 January, heading home against RC Celta de Vigo in a 1–1 home draw in the quarter-finals of the Copa del Rey (2–1 aggregate win); gradually, he established himself in the starting lineup ahead of longtime incumbent Raúl García, also reuniting with former Benfica teammate Simão Sabrosa.

After helping the Colchoneros to the domestic cup final – he was cup-tied for the Europa League – a new loan deal was arranged with Juventus. Again, he played in significantly more minutes than García as Atlético finally qualified to the Europa League, and added four goals in La Liga, including a brace to help defeat Málaga CF 3–0 away, both goals coming from headers.

On 20 July 2011, Tiago signed a permanent two-year deal. He was again an important part of the team that reached the Europa League final, usually playing as a starter under coach Diego Simeone, who replaced Gregorio Manzano midway through the season; he missed the decisive match in Bucharest however, being sent off in the semi-final's second leg against Valencia CF (1–0 away victory, 5–2 on aggregate) after slapping Roberto Soldado.

On 21 July 2014, aged 33, Tiago renewed his contract with Atlético for two seasons. On 13 September he put the visiting team ahead at Real Madrid after heading home a corner kick from Koke, in an eventual 2–1 win. In the reverse fixture on 7 February 2015, he opened the scoring in a 4–0 rout; eighteen days later, he received his marching orders in the 0–1 away loss to Bayer 04 Leverkusen in the first leg of the Champions League last-16.

On 28 November 2015, in the first half of the league fixture against RCD Espanyol, Tiago suffered an undisplaced fracture to his right tibia, going on to be sidelined for several months. He left the Vicente Calderón Stadium at the end of the 2016–17 campaign, with competitive totals of 229 games and 19 goals both spells comprised.

International career

Tiago's performances in Portugal's youth teams eventually earned him his senior debut against Scotland in a November 2002 friendly. He went on to seal a regular berth in the squad and was included in the 23-man list for UEFA Euro 2004, although he did not play in the finals; originally part of the squad for that year's Summer Olympic Games, he withdrew through injury.

Moving to France proved crucial in international selection as Tiago's strong form at Lyon afforded him a place in Portugal's well-established midfield. His contributions aided the national team in their quest for qualification for the 2006 FIFA World Cup, and he appeared in five matches in the tournament held in Germany as Portugal reached the semi-finals, losing to France.

Tiago scored his first goal on 28 March 2007, in a Player of the match display away to Serbia (1–1). He was, however, overlooked, for Euro 2008's final squad.

Tiago was selected for the squad at the 2010 World Cup in South Africa, replacing Deco in the first game, a 0–0 against the Ivory Coast. He took the naturalised Brazilian's place for the following fixture, netting twice (including a header) in a 7–0 demolition of North Korea in Cape Town on 21 June.

After the World Cup, Tiago officially quit the national team citing personal reasons, and also to "make room for opportunities for younger players," ending his international career with 58 caps and three goals. On 3 October 2014, however, after an absence of almost four years, he was called up by new manager Fernando Santos for a friendly with France and the Euro 2016 qualifier against Denmark. He was sent off for two bookings on 13 June 2015, in a 3–2 win in Armenia in another qualifying match; he was not selected for the finals, not having fully recovered from a broken leg.

Coaching career
Immediately after retiring, Tiago spent one year as assistant to former manager Simeone. He returned to the national team setup in June 2019, working with every age group from the under-15s to the under-20s.

Tiago had his first head coaching experience on 28 July 2020, signing a two-year contract with Vitória de Guimarães. He signed his former international teammate Ricardo Quaresma. On his managerial debut on 18 September, he lost by one goal at home to Belenenses SAD.

Tiago resigned on 8 October 2020, having taken four points from three games.

Style of play
A versatile defensive or central midfielder, with good vision and overall skills, Tiago was known mainly for his work-rate, tenacity and tackling ability, as well as his accurate distribution of the ball after winning back possession. These attributes earned him the nickname "the washing machine" during his time with Lyon.

Career statistics

Club

International

Scores and results list Portugal's goal tally first, score column indicates score after each Tiago goal.

Managerial statistics

Honours
Benfica
Taça de Portugal: 2003–04

Chelsea
Premier League: 2004–05
Football League Cup: 2004–05
FA Community Shield: 2005

Lyon
Ligue 1: 2005–06, 2006–07
Coupe de la Ligue runner-up: 2006–07

Atlético Madrid

La Liga: 2013–14
Copa del Rey: 2012–13
Supercopa de España: 2014
UEFA Europa League: 2011–12
UEFA Champions League runner-up: 2013–14, 2015–16

Portugal
UEFA European Championship runner-up: 2004

Orders
 Medal of Merit, Order of the Immaculate Conception of Vila Viçosa (House of Braganza)

References

External links

Tiago at Atlético Madrid

1981 births
Living people
People from Viana do Castelo
Sportspeople from Viana do Castelo District
Portuguese footballers
Association football midfielders
Primeira Liga players
Segunda Divisão players
S.C. Braga B players
S.C. Braga players
S.L. Benfica footballers
Premier League players
Chelsea F.C. players
Ligue 1 players
Olympique Lyonnais players
Serie A players
Juventus F.C. players
La Liga players
Atlético Madrid footballers
Portugal youth international footballers
Portugal under-21 international footballers
Portugal international footballers
UEFA Euro 2004 players
2006 FIFA World Cup players
2010 FIFA World Cup players
Portuguese expatriate footballers
Expatriate footballers in England
Expatriate footballers in France
Expatriate footballers in Italy
Expatriate footballers in Spain
Portuguese expatriate sportspeople in England
Portuguese expatriate sportspeople in France
Portuguese expatriate sportspeople in Italy
Portuguese expatriate sportspeople in Spain
Portuguese football managers
Primeira Liga managers
Vitória S.C. managers